Scena potentia is a moth in the subfamily Arctiinae. It was described by Herbert Druce in 1894. It is found in Mexico and Costa Rica.

References

Moths described in 1894
Euchromiina